An epic catalogue is a long, detailed list of objects, places or people that is a characteristic of epic poetry.

Examples 
In The Faerie Queene, the list of trees I.i.8-9.
In Paradise Lost, the list of demons in Book I.
In the Aeneid, the list of enemies the Trojans find in Etruria in Book VII. Also, the list of ships in Book X.
In the Iliad:
Catalogue of Ships, the most famous epic catalogue
Trojan Battle Order

References 

Rhetorical techniques
Narrative techniques
Epic poetry